Autoimmune progesterone dermatitis may appear as urticarial papules, deep gyrate lesions, papulovesicular lesions, an eczematous eruption, or as targetoid lesions. Autoimmune progesterone dermatitis initially manifests with eye symptoms, e.g. burning, and progresses into rashes. Its relapsing-remitting pattern in women correspond to the progesterone levels during the menstrual cycle, which spike twice a month. It is an extremely rare disease.

See also
Skin lesion

References

External links 

Eczema